The Netherlands Royal Shooting Sport Association, Dutch Koninklijke Nederlandse Schutters Associatie, is a shooting sport governing body in the Netherlands which is internationally affiliated with the International Shooting Sport Federation (ISSF) and Muzzle Loaders Associations International Committee (MLAIC).

See also 
 Netherlands Practical Shooting Association

External links 
 The official website for the KNSA

Shooting sports organizations
Shooting sports in the Netherlands